7800 series may refer to:

 Chichibu Railway 7800 series electric multiple unit
 Hokuso 7800 series, a sub-variant of the Hokuso 7300 series electric multiple unit
 Tobu 7800 series electric multiple unit